Çiçi (also, Chichi, Dare-Chichi, and Dera-Chichi) is a village and municipality in the Quba Rayon of Azerbaijan.  It has a population of 1,131.  The municipality consists of the villages of Çiçi, Qənidərə, and Raziyələr.

References

External links

Populated places in Quba District (Azerbaijan)